Thomas A. Hendricks House and Stone Head Road Marker is a historic home and road marker located at Stone Head, Van Buren Township, Brown County, Indiana.  The house was built in 1891, and is a two-story, "T"-shaped frame dwelling.  It rests on a sandstone foundation and features three prominent projecting gables.  The Stone Head Road Marker was erected in 1851.  It was carved of sandstone by local gravestone carver Henry Cross.

It was listed on the National Register of Historic Places in 1984.

Gallery

References

External links

Houses on the National Register of Historic Places in Indiana
Houses completed in 1891
Houses in Brown County, Indiana
National Register of Historic Places in Brown County, Indiana
1891 establishments in Indiana